Hugh Lyle Smyth (15 Nov 1834 – 25 May 1911) was a wealthy merchant and a JP who was appointed High Sheriff of Cheshire in 1895.

He was born in Derry to Ross Thompson Smyth and Sarah Lyle. He married Eliza Turner of Rusholme Park on 5 June 1862. They had eleven children. Their family home was Crabwall Hall, in the village of Mollington, Cheshire. He had a large country house, Barrowmore Hall in Great Barrow, Cheshire, designed by the architect, John Douglas (1829–1911) and completed c. 1881. His daughter Una Maud Lyle Smyth was a novelist who wrote under the name Marius Lyle.

References

External links
 Barrowmore History

1833 births
1911 deaths
High Sheriffs of Cheshire
19th-century English businesspeople